Grinăuți is a commune in Rîșcani District, Moldova. It is composed of two villages, Ciobanovca and Grinăuți.

Notable people
 Andrei Sangheli
 Nicolae Dudău
 Vitalia Pavlicenco

References

Communes of Rîșcani District